Robert Foster (19 July 1929 – 2006) was an English footballer who played in the Football League for Chesterfield, Preston North End and Rotherham United.

External links
 

English footballers
English Football League players
1929 births
2006 deaths
Chesterfield F.C. players
Preston North End F.C. players
Rotherham United F.C. players
Wigan Athletic F.C. players
Association football forwards
FA Cup Final players